Yeldo Mar Baselios College, Kothamangalam, was established in 2003. The college is run by Sophia Educational Agency and is a non-profit organisation. It specialises in vocational courses.

References

External links

Arts and Science colleges in Kerala
Universities and colleges in Ernakulam district
Colleges affiliated to Mahatma Gandhi University, Kerala
Educational institutions established in 2003
2003 establishments in Kerala